KOYO-LP (107.1 FM) is a low-powered community radio station licensed to serve Oroville, California. The station is owned by the African American & Family Cultural Center. It airs a variety format.  The studio is located on Bird Street in Oroville. The transmitter is located on top of the historical Oroville Hotel.

The station was assigned the KRBS-LP call letters by the Federal Communications Commission on April 26, 2001. The station changed its call sign to the current KOYO-LP on December 30, 2013.

KRBS-LP was the second community radio barnraising of the Prometheus Radio Project.

Studios
The KOYO-LP studios were originally located at 2076 Bird Street but have recently moved to 2360 Oro Quincy Highway.

See also
List of community radio stations in the United States

References

External links
 

OYO-LP
Community radio stations in the United States
Radio stations established in 2002
OYO-LP
Butte County, California
2002 establishments in California
Oroville, California